The Newton rail accident may refer to:

Newton (South Lanarkshire) rail accident in 1991
Newton (Massachusetts) rail accident in 2008